Andrew Appleton (born 18 June 1982) is a motorcycle racer from England.

Career
Appleton competes in grasstrack, longtrack and speedway.

Speedway
Appleton's first full season in the British leagues was when he rode for Newport Wasps during the 1999 Premier League speedway season. The Welsh team enjoyed a good season finishing runner-up to Sheffield Tigers.

He was part of the Oxford Cheetahs title winning team during the 2001 Elite League speedway season.

Longtrack
In 2015, Appleton was part of the British team with Richard Hall, Glen Phillips and James Shanes that won the world championship gold medal at the 2015 Team Long Track World Championship. It was the first time that Britain had won the event.

Grasstrack
His biggest solo honour to date was his Gold medal success in the European Grasstrack Championship in 2010 and the winning Grand Prix in Eenrum the same year, along with 4 time British Master championships titles (2007, 2010,1011,2014)

Major results

Longtrack

World Individual Championship
 2003 4 app (18th) 18pts
 2004 5 app (6th) 59pts
 2005 4 app (10th) 34pts
 2006 2 app (16th) 12pts
 2007 3 app (5th) 41pts
 2008 4 app (4th) 62pts
 2009 4 app (14th) 37pts
 2010 4 app (6th) 102pts
 2011 6 app (15th) 48pts
 2012 4 app (12th) 53pts
 2014 4 app (13th) 28pts
 2015 4 app (15th) 21pts
 2016 4 app (13th) 28pts

Best Grand-Prix results

  Eenrum First 2010
  Forssa Second 2011
  Marianske Lazne Second 2010
  Morizes Third 2008
  Vechta Second 2008

World Team Championship

 2007 -   Morizes (with Paul Hurry, Glen Phillips & Mitch Godden) Second
 2009 -   Eenrum (with Paul Hurry, Glen Phillips & Richard Hall) Fourth
 2010 -   Morizes (with Glen Phillips, Richard Hall & Chris Mills) Fourth
 2011 -   Scheeßel (with Paul Cooper, Glen Phillips & Mitch Godden) Third
 2013 -   Folkestone (with Richard Hall, Glen Phillips & Paul Cooper) Third
 2014 -   Forssa (with Glen Phillips, Richard Hall & David Howe) Fifth
 2015 -   Muhldorf (with Glen Phillips, Richard Hall & James Shanes) First
 2016 -   Mariánské Lázně (with Glen Phillips, Richard Hall & James Shanes) 4th
 2017 -   Roden (with Edward Kennett, Richard Hall & James Shanes) 6th

Grasstrack

European Championship

 2003  La Reole (13th) 7pts
 2004  Eenrum (6th) 12pts
 2005  Schwarme (Third) 12pts
 2006  La Reole (6th) 18pts
 2007  Folkestone (Third) 20pts
 2008 Semi-final
 2009  Berghaupten (16th) 6pts
 2010  La Reole (Champion) 18pts
 2011  Skegness (Third) 15pts
 2012 Semi-final
 2013 Semi-final
 2014  St. Macaire (8th) 12pts
 2015  Staphorst (6th) 12pts
 2016  Folkestone (Third) 15pts
 2017  Hertingen (Second) 16pts

British Masters

Podium Finishes

 2002  Skegness Third
 2004  Skegness Second
 2006  Wadebridge Champion
 2009  Blackwater Third
 2010  Folkestone Champion
 2011  Folkestone Champion
 2013  Wimborne Second
 2014  Folkestone Champion
 2015  Wimborne Second

References 

British motorcycle racers
1982 births
Individual Speedway Long Track World Championship riders
Living people
British speedway riders
Oxford Cheetahs riders